PK-109 Lower South Waziristan is a constituency for the Khyber Pakhtunkhwa Assembly of the Khyber Pakhtunkhwa province of Pakistan.

Members of Assembly

2019-2023: PK-114 South Waziristan-II

Election 2019 

After merger of FATA with Khyber Pakhtunkhwa provincial elections were held for the very first time. PTI Candidate Naseer Ullah Khan won the seat by getting 11,114 votes.

See also 

 PK-108 Tank
 PK-110 Upper South Waziristan

References

External links 

 Khyber Pakhtunkhwa Assembly's official website
 Election Commission of Pakistan's official website
 Awaztoday.com Search Result
 Election Commission Pakistan Search Result

Khyber Pakhtunkhwa Assembly constituencies